Sergio Obeso Rivera (31 October 1931 – 11 August 2019) was a Mexican prelate of the Catholic Church. He was Archbishop of Xalapa from 1979 to 2007 after serving as Bishop of Papantla from 1971 to 1974 and then as coadjutor in Xalapa from 1974 to 1979. Pope Francis created him a cardinal on 28 June 2018.

Biography
Sergio Obeso Rivera was born in Xalapa, Mexico on 31 October 1931. His father was a native of Asturias, Spain, and his mother was from Las Vigas de Ramírez, where he was raised. He entered the seminary in Xalapa on 23 January 1944 and was ordained in Rome on 31 October 1954 and while earning his doctorate in theology at the Pontifical Gregorian University. Until 1971 he held various positions at the Xalapa seminary, including prefect of philosophy, spiritual director, and rector.

On 30 April 1971, Pope Paul VI appointed him Bishop of Papantla and he was consecrated a bishop on 29 July.

On 18 January 1974, Pope Paul appointed him titular archbishop of Uppenna and Archbishop Coadjutor of Xalapa, and on 12 March 1979 he became Archbishop of Xalapa.

He was elected to the three three-year terms as president of the Episcopal Conference of Mexico in 1982, 1985, and 1994. He was also president of the Conference's Commission for Social Pastoral Care in 2002 when it called for reform of Mexico's Law of Indian Rights and Culture in a statement that said: "It is not possible to continue to live in a Mexico divided by racism and discrimination. The Indian peoples justly deserve the recognition of their cultures, of their way of seeing things, and of their autonomy."

Pope Benedict XVI accepted his resignation on 10 April 2007.

Pope Francis made Obeso a cardinal on 28 June 2018, assigning him the titular church of San Leone I. He took possession of his titular church at a Mass on 1 July.

In August 2018, Obeso said that while some accusations made by victims of Catholic Church sexual abuse cases are valid, about those who make accusations of pedophilia against Catholic clerics some should be "ashamed" to point their finger and "should have a little pity because they have tails that are stepped on, very long."

He died on 11 August 2019 at his home in Coatepec.

See also
 Cardinals created by Francis
 Catholic Church in Mexico

References

External links

 
 Archdiocese of Xalapa 

1931 births
2019 deaths
Bishops appointed by Pope Paul VI
Cardinals created by Pope Francis
People from Xalapa
Mexican people of Spanish descent
Pontifical Gregorian University alumni
20th-century Roman Catholic archbishops in Mexico
21st-century Roman Catholic archbishops in Mexico
Mexican cardinals